St. Mark United Methodist Church may mean:
St. Mark United Methodist Church (Atlanta)
St. Mark's United Methodist Church in Raleigh, North Carolina